Sunkara Rao may refer to:
 Sunkara Balaparameswara Rao (born 1928), neurosurgeon
 Sunkara Venkata Adinarayana Rao (born 1939), Indian orthopaedic surgeon